Welcome to My City 2 is an album by rapper Drumma Boy. The album features exclusive tracks from Drumma Boy with appearances by Young Buck, Gangsta Boo, DJ Paul, Juicy J, 8 Ball & MJG and more. It was released for digital download on March 30, 2012.

Track list

References

2012 mixtape albums
Drumma Boy albums
Albums produced by Drumma Boy
Sequel albums